Fazlul Haque Aspia (1935/6 – 15 September 2021) was a Bangladesh Nationalist Party politician and a member of parliament of Sunamganj-4.

Career
Aspia was elected to parliament from Sunamganj-4 as a Bangladesh Nationalist Party candidate in 1996 and 2001. He served as the Whip during the 8th parliamentary session.

Aspia died on 15 September 2021 at the age of 85.

References

1930s births
2021 deaths
Bangladesh Nationalist Party politicians
7th Jatiya Sangsad members
8th Jatiya Sangsad members
Year of birth missing
People from Sunamganj District